Intelligence is a British television sitcom created by Nick Mohammed and starring David Schwimmer. It began airing on Sky One on 21 February 2020. The network confirmed a series 2 pickup on 13 February 2020. Series 2 premiered on 8 June 2021 on Sky One and streaming service Now.

Plot
An NSA agent (David Schwimmer) is assigned to act as liaison to the cyber crimes unit in the UK's Government Communications Headquarters, quickly antagonising the unit's chief with his brash style and tendency to try to take over.

Cast

Main
David Schwimmer as Jerry Bernstein  
Nick Mohammed as Joseph Harries
Jane Stanness as Mary
Sylvestra Le Touzel as Christine Cranfield
Gana Bayarsaikhan as Tuva Olsen
Eliot Salt as Evelyn
Oliver Birch as Quentin O'Higgins

Recurring
Colin Salmon as Rupert Fleming
Lucy Ware as Uma
Joey Slotnick as Clint, an FBI agent

Episodes

Series 1 (2020)

Series 2 (2021)

Release
The series aired in the United Kingdom on Sky One. It was also viewable through Sky's Now platform.

It was broadcast in Australia on ABC Comedy as well as the network's iView platform, and on Peacock in the United States.

In Canada, the series premiered on Showcase, on September 13, 2020. This was followed by Latin America through Warner on November 4, 2020. Spanish pay TV network Cosmo premiered the show on January 15, 2021.

References

External links

Intelligence GCHQ sitcom starring David Schwimmer airs on Sky One February 2020

2020 British television series debuts
2021 British television series endings
2020s British sitcoms
2020s British workplace comedy television series
Sky sitcoms
English-language television shows
GCHQ
Television series about computing
Television series about intelligence agencies
British spy fiction